The A. Armstrong Farm was a historic farm located at Hockessin, New Castle County, Delaware. The property included two contributing buildings.  They were a log house with a stone addition added in the 1830s, and a frame tri-level stone and frame barn (c. 1830s).  The stuccoed log section was three bays wide, and it had a two-story, two bay stone wing. The farm house and barn were demolished before 2002.

It was added to the National Register of Historic Places in 1986.

References

Farms on the National Register of Historic Places in Delaware
Houses completed in 1835
Houses in New Castle County, Delaware
National Register of Historic Places in New Castle County, Delaware